The Nikon CX format is an image sensor format by Nikon for the Nikon 1 series MILCs featuring the Nikon 1 mount bayonet and lenses. With 2.7 times crop factor being approximately 13.2 x 8.8mm2 (also known as 1"-type) it considerably increases the depth of field by 2.90 stops (2.7 times crop factor) compared to a 35mm FX camera with the same angle of view. The format was created September 2011 by Nikon for its mirrorless interchangeable-lens cameras, the Nikon 1 series.

It is the third format and second mount from Nikon after the Nikon F-mount Nikon DX format and the full-frame Nikon FX format.

Lenses

See also
Nikon 1 series
Image sensor format

References

External links
 Advanced Camera with Interchangeable Lens Nikon 1 J1 / V1 Nikon

C
Digital photography
Nikon 1-mount cameras